This is a list of episodes of the 2015 Ultra Series Ultraman X.

Episodes



Notes

References

X